Scott Lindsey (born 4 May 1972) is an English former footballer who played as a midfielder in the Football League for Gillingham. He is the current manager of Crawley Town.

Playing career
Lindsey started his career with Goole Town before signing for Football Conference side Stafford Rangers and then having spells with Burton Albion and Sutton Coldfield Town. He later joined Tamworth, debuting in the 2–1 Southern Football League Midland division victory at Evesham United on 30 August 1993 and went on to make a total of 22 appearances for the club, (14 of which came in the Southern Football League before departing after a final appearance as a substitute in the 2–1 home league victory over Leicester United on 4 December 1993). 

He moved on to join Bridlington Town before signing for Gillingham in July 1994 and made his debut for the club in the 1–0 home defeat to Carlisle United on 31 December 1994. Lindsey made 12 appearances in the league that season but failed to make the Gills team at the start of the following season and moved on to join Dover Athletic in October 1995 spending the next two seasons with the club before moving on to Sittingbourne and Ashford Town (Kent).

Lindsey played for Canvey Island, scoring his first goal for the club in a 3–0 Isthmian League First Division home victory over Wembley on 23 January 1999, before being released in September 1999 and joining Gravesend & Northfleet where he remained until spending the 2001–02 season with Welling United. In July 2002 he joined Folkestone Invicta, making his 100th start for the club in the FA Cup Second Qualifying Round Replay at home to Harrow Borough on 5 October 2004.

In January 2006, he joined Maidstone United debuting in the 2–0 Kentish Observer Football League Cup Group C victory at VCD Athletic on 24 January 2006.
He joined Sittingbourne in March 2008, debuting as a second-half substitute in the 2–1 Isthmian League Division One South home defeat to Croydon Athletic on 8 March 2008.

Coaching career
Lindsey rejoined Folkestone Invicta as a player/coach but left the club in January 2009 to become Technical Development Coach at Gillingham where his role was to set up Development Centres in and around Kent for young children whilst also working at the club's Centre of Excellence in Canterbury with the Under 9s right through to the Under 16s. 

Following the appointment of Chris Sutton as manager of Lincoln City at the end of September 2009, Lindsey was appointed first-team coach at the club and would later serve as caretaker manager. On 18 May 2011 he departed Sincil Bank with his contract being cancelled by mutual consent following the club's relegation from The Football League.

He was appointed as the under 18s manager at Swindon Town in the summer of 2014. In June 2016 though he left Swindon to take on the role of assistant manager at Forest Green Rovers.

On 22 July 2021, Lindsey left Chatham Town and rejoined Swindon Town as assistant manager and was announced as the club's new head coach in June 2022 following the departure of Ben Garner for Charlton Athletic.

On 11 January 2023, when Swindon were eighth in League Two, Lindsey was appointed manager of another League Two side, Crawley Town, on an initial two-and-a-half year contract.

Managerial statistics

Personal life
Scott Lindsey is the son of the former Gillingham right-back Keith Lindsey and was described as "a chip off the old block in the same position and for the same club".

He was married to Hayley for 16 years until her death from cancer at the age of 44 in November 2019.  The couple had three daughters.  His brother Matthew died in a motorcycle accident in 1995 on his way back from watching Lindsey play in a match.

References

External links

1972 births
Living people
Sportspeople from Walsall
English footballers
Association football midfielders
Goole Town F.C. players
Stafford Rangers F.C. players
Burton Albion F.C. players
Sutton Coldfield Town F.C. players
Tamworth F.C. players
Bridlington Town A.F.C. players
Gillingham F.C. players
Dover Athletic F.C. players
Sittingbourne F.C. players
Ashford United F.C. players
Canvey Island F.C. players
Ebbsfleet United F.C. players
Welling United F.C. players
Folkestone Invicta F.C. players
Maidstone United F.C. players
English Football League players
English football managers
Lincoln City F.C. managers
English Football League managers
Gillingham F.C. non-playing staff
Forest Green Rovers F.C. non-playing staff
Chatham Town F.C. managers
Swindon Town F.C. non-playing staff
Swindon Town F.C. managers
Crawley Town F.C. managers
Association football coaches